Kworatem (also, Cor-a-tem and Quoratem) is a former Karok settlement in Humboldt County, California. It was located at the confluence of the Klamath and Salmon Rivers, at an elevation of 515 feet (157 m). 

The name Quoratem was erroneously used by Gibbs for the Karok Indians, and was adopted by Powell in the adjectival form Quoratean  as the name of the linguistic family constituted by the Karok.

References

Former settlements in Humboldt County, California
Former Native American populated places in California
Karuk villages